SECC may refer to:
 Software Engineering Competence Center is an Egyptian leading ICT organization aiming at bridging the gap between the technologies needed to overcome the economical-social-environmental challenges and the current existing technologies. In June 2001, SECC was inaugurated as part of the efforts sponsored by the Ministry of Communications and Information Technology (MCIT) to support Information Technology Industry in Egypt.In year 2005, SECC was merged into the Information Technology Industry Development Agency (ITIDA). ITIDA is a governmental organization developing IT industry in Egypt. It is significantly financed by the private ICT sector with significant presence of private ICT business representatives on its Board of Directors.
 Social Entrepreneurship and Consulting Cell, Symbiosis Institute of Business Management, Pune, India (SIBM Pune).
 Single Edge Contact Cartridge, a connector for microprocessors.
 SECC (metal), a low-cost sheet metal often used for computer cases.
 SEC Centre, formerly Scottish Exhibition and Conference Centre, an exhibition space in Glasgow, Scotland.
 Socio Economic and Caste Census, conducted as part of the Census of India, first in 2011.
 Southeastern Ceremonial Complex, the iconographic and mythological complex of the Mississippian culture.
 Southeastern California Conference of Seventh-day Adventists, the Seventh-day Adventist conference-level governing body that encompasses and oversees all Southeastern California Seventh-day Adventist organizations.
 Sands Expo and Convention Center, an exhibition and convention center located in Las Vegas, Nevada, United States.